Scabiosa triandra is a species of scabious belonging to the family Caprifoliaceae.

Description
Flowering period extends from June to September.

Distribution
This species can be found in Southern Europe.

References

triandra